Jacksonena rudis is a species of air-breathing land snails, terrestrial pulmonate gastropod mollusks in the family Camaenidae. This species is endemic to Australia.

References 

Gastropods of Australia
rudis
Gastropods described in 1912
Taxonomy articles created by Polbot